Syed Ali (12 July 1913 – 3 February 1993) was a Trinidadian cricketer. He played in five first-class matches for Trinidad and Tobago from 1940 to 1943.

See also
 List of Trinidadian representative cricketers

References

External links
 

1913 births
1993 deaths
Trinidad and Tobago cricketers